Dr. D. Y. Patil Medical College, Navi Mumbai is a medical college in Navi Mumbai, Maharashtra. The college imparts the degree Bachelor of Medicine and Bachelor of Surgery (MBBS). It is recognised by the Medical Council of India. The hospital associated with the college is one of the largest in Navi Mumbai.

References

External links 
http://www.dypatil.edu/

Medical colleges in Maharashtra
Universities and colleges in Maharashtra
Educational institutions established in 1989
1989 establishments in Maharashtra